The 441st Air Expeditionary Squadron is a provisional United States Air Force unit. It was converted to provisional status in May 2011.

Its last assignment as a regular unit was to the 320th Bombardment Wing at Mather Air Force Base, California, where it was inactivated on 30 September 1989.

The squadron was first activated during World War II as the 441st Bombardment Squadron.  It served in combat in the Mediterranean Theater of Operations, where it earned two Distinguished Unit Citations and the French Croix de Guerre with Palm.  After V-E Day, the squadron returned to the United States for inactivation.

Although briefly active in the reserve from 1947-1949, the squadron was primarily a Strategic Air Command bomber unit, first with Boeing B-47 Stratojets, then with Boeing B-52 Stratofortresses.  Although it did not serve as a unit, the squadron was one of the first to deploy aircraft and aircrew for Operation Arc Light missions in Vietnam.  The squadron was inactivated in 1989, in connection with the reduction of strategic forces and the closure of Mather.

History

World War II
Established in mid-1942 as a B-26 Marauder medium bomber group.  Trained under Third Air Force in Florida, deployed to England under the VIII Air Support Command, 3d Bombardment Wing.

Operated against targets on the continent during early fall of 1942; deployed to North Africa as part of Twelfth Air Force after Operation Torch landings in Algeria in November.   Flew tactical bombing missions against Axis forces in North Africa until the end of the Tunisian Campaign in May 1943.  Participated in the Sicilian and Italian Campaigns; liberation of Corsica and Sardinia and the Invasion of Southern France.   Supported Allied ground forces in the Western Allied Invasion of Germany, spring 1945 and becoming part of the United States Air Forces in Europe Army of Occupation in Germany, fall 1945.    Personnel demobilized in Germany and the squadron inactivated as a paper unit in December 1945.

Reserves
Reactivated in the reserves in 1947.  Never manned or equipped.

Strategic Air Command bomber operations
Reactivated in 1952 as a Boeing B-47 Stratojet squadron,.  Initially equipped with prototypes of the Boeing RB-47B Stratojet (YRB-47) to perform long-range photo-reconnaissance with a flight of Boeing B-29 Superfortress bombers assigned.  In November 1953 began to receive production B-47E medium bomber aircraft; prototype reconnaissance aircraft already received exchanged for medium bomber versions.  Participated in SAC REFLEX deployments to Europe and North Africa throughout the 1950s.  Squadron discontinued, 16 September 1960 and B-47 aircraft sent to storage at Davis-Monthan as part of phaseout of B-47.

Activated as a Boeing B-52 Stratofortress heavy bombardment squadron, absorbing the mission aircraft and personnel of the 72d Bombardment Squadron, which was simultaneously inactivated.    Operated B-52Fs until 1968 standing SAC nuclear alert duties, then upgraded to B-52G models.   Performed rotational deployments to Western Pacific with B-52Gs, engaging in Operation Arc Light combat missions over Indochina during Vietnam War.   Maintained conventional bombing capabilities after end of United States involvement in Vietnam War until inactivation in 1989 as part of retirement of B-52G.

Expeditionary unit
The squadron was converted to provisional status as the 441st Air Expeditionary Squadron and assigned to Air Combat Command to activate as needed.

The 441st Air Expeditionary Squadron reportedly maintains an unpaved runway in Sarrin, Raqqa Governorate.

Lineage
 Constituted as the 441st Bombardment Squadron (Medium) on 19 June 1942
 Activated on 1 July 1942
 Redesignated 441st Bombardment Squadron, Medium on 9 October 1944
 Inactivated on 6 December 1945
 Redesignated 441st Bombardment Squadron, Light on 26 May 1947
 Activated in the reserve on 9 July 1947
 Inactivated on 27 June 1949
 Redesignated 441st Bombardment Squadron, Medium and activated on 1 December 1952
 Discontinued on 15 September 1960
 Redesignated 441st Bombardment Squadron, Heavy on 15 November 1962 (not organized)
 Organized on 1 February 1963
 Inactivated on 30 September 1989
 Redesignated 441st Air Expeditionary Squadron and converted to provisional status on 13 May 2011

Assignments
 320th Bombardment Group, 1 July 1942 – 4 December 1945
 320th Bombardment Group, 9 July 1947 – 27 June 1949
 320th Bombardment Wing, 1 December 1952
 Strategic Air Command, 15 November 1962 (not organized)
 320th Bombardment Wing, 1 February 1963 – 30 September 1989
 Air Combat Command to activate or inactivate as needed at any time after 13 May 2011

Stations

 MacDill Field, Florida, 1 July 1942
 Drane Field, Florida, 8–28 August 1942
 RAF Hethel (AAF-114), England, 12 September 1942
 RAF Tibenham (AAF-124), England, 1 October 1942
 Oran Es Sénia Airport, Algeria, 9 January 1943
 Tafaraoui Airfield, Algeria, 28 January 1943
 Montesquieu Airfield, Algeria, 14 April 1943
 Massicault Airfield, Tunisia, 29 June 1943
 El Bathan Airfield, Tunisia, 28 July 1943

 Decimomannu Airfield, Sardinia, Italy, 9 November 1943
 Alto Airfield, Corsica, France, 20 September 1944
 Dijon-Longvic Airfield (Y-9), France, 11 November 1944
 Dôle-Tavaux Airfield (Y-7), France, 2 April 1945
 AAF Station Fürth (R-28), Germany, 20 June 1945
 Clastres Airfield (A-71), France, c. October-27 November 1945
 Camp Shanks, New York, 4–6 December 1945
 Mitchel Field, New York, 9 July 1947 – 27 June 1949
 March Air Force Base, California, 1 December 1952
 Mather Air Force Base, California, 1 February 1963 – 30 September 1989

Aircraft

 Martin B-26 Marauder, 1942–1945
 Boeing B-29 Superfortress, 1952–1953
 Boeing YRB-47B Stratojet, 1953
 Boeing B-47 Stratojet, 1953–1960
 Boeing B-52F Stratofortress (1963–1968)
 Boeing B-52G Stratofortress (1968–1989)

See also

 List of B-52 Units of the United States Air Force

References
 Notes

 Citations

Bibliography

External links
 
 

Air expeditionary squadrons of the United States Air Force